The 1988 West Coast Athletic Conference men's basketball tournament was held March 5–7 at the Toso Pavilion (now Leavey Center) on the campus of Santa Clara University in Santa Clara, California. This was the second edition of the tournament; it included all eight teams and all seven games were held at the same site.

Regular season champion Loyola Marymount defeated tournament host and #3 seed   in the final to win their first WCAC (now WCC) tournament 

The Lions earned the automatic bid to the 64-team NCAA tournament and were seeded tenth in the West regional. Sent to Salt Lake City, they outscored Wyoming 119–115, but were stopped  by second-seeded North Carolina.

Bracket

Notes
The tournament champion, Loyola Marymount, scored over 100 points in all three games (San Diego: 110-104, Pepperdine: 109-106, Santa Clara: 104-96) for a total of 323 points.

References

West Coast Conference men's basketball tournament
Tournament
West Coast Athletic Conference men's basketball tournament
West Coast Athletic Conference men's basketball tournament